

Clemens Betzel (9 June 1895 – 27 March 1945) was a German general in the Wehrmacht of Nazi Germany who commanded the 4. Panzer-Division during World War II. He was a recipient of the  Knight's Cross of the Iron Cross with Oak Leaves. He died of a shell splinter during the east pomeranian offensive.

Awards and decorations
 Clasp to the Iron Cross (1939) 2nd Class (24 September 1939) & 1st Class (10 October 1939)
 German Cross in Gold on 11 March 1943 as Oberst in Panzer-Artillerie-Regiment 103
 Knight's Cross of the Iron Cross with Oak Leaves
 Knight's Cross on 5 September 1944 as Generalmajor and commander of 4. Panzer-Division
 Oak Leaves on 11 March 1945 as Generalleutnant and commander of 4. Panzer-Division

References

Citations

Bibliography

 
 
 

1895 births
1945 deaths
Lieutenant generals of the German Army (Wehrmacht)
German Army personnel of World War I
German Army personnel killed in World War II
Recipients of the clasp to the Iron Cross, 1st class
Recipients of the Gold German Cross
Recipients of the Knight's Cross of the Iron Cross with Oak Leaves
People from the Kingdom of Württemberg
Military personnel from Ulm
German Army generals of World War II